Dr. Emmanuel Ija is a South Sudanese physician and politician. As of 2011, he is the Minister of Health of Central Equatoria.

References

21st-century South Sudanese politicians
Living people
South Sudanese physicians
People from Central Equatoria
Year of birth missing (living people)
Place of birth missing (living people)